Casteddu di Tappa is a Bronze Age archaeological site of the Torreann Culture, in Corsica. It is located in the commune of Porto-Vecchio.

See also
Prehistory of Corsica

References
 Le gisement torréen fortifié de Tappa, Porto-Vecchio (Corse), Roger Grosjean, at Persee

Archaeological sites in Corsica